The injured reserve list ( IR list) is a designation used in North American professional sports leagues for athletes who suffer injuries and become unable to play. The exact name of the list varies by league; it is known as "injured reserve" in the National Football League (NFL) and National Hockey League (NHL), the "injured list" in the Canadian Football League (CFL), and the injured list (historically known as the "disabled list") in Major League Baseball (MLB). The National Basketball Association (NBA) does not have a direct analog to an injured reserve list, instead using a more general-purpose "inactive list" that does not require a player to be injured.

Injured reserve lists are used because the rules of these leagues allow for only a certain numbers of players on each team's roster. Designating a player as "Injured/Reserve" frees up a roster spot, enabling the team to add a new replacement player during the injured athlete's convalescence.

NHL rules
A player may be placed on injured reserve if he is unable to participate due to illness or injury, provided that the player had passed the club's initial physical examination at the start of the season. To qualify for the IR due to injury, that injury must be sufficient (in the opinion of the team's medical staff) to render the player unable to participate for the seven days following that injury. Once placed on IR, the team may then replace the player on their roster. The player on IR may not return to active play for seven days, although they may participate in non-competitive events such as practice, meetings, etc.

NFL rules
A team may place a player on injured reserve (reserve/injured list) who is "not immediately available for participation with a club". Generally, these players may not practice or return to the active roster for the rest of the season (including postseason games or the Pro Bowl) in which they are placed on injured reserve but are allowed to be with the team.

Starting in 2012, the NFL and the NFLPA reached an agreement allowing one player placed on injured reserve to be brought back to the active roster. Provided that the player was on the final 53-man preseason roster (a rule exempted for the 2012 season), and that the injury is deemed to keep this player unable to practice or play football for an estimated six weeks, the player may be allowed to practice after Week 6, and be activated to play after Week 8. In 2017, the rule was changed to allow up to two players to return from injured reserve after Week 8. In 2018, the rule was slightly modified due to timing of team bye weeks so players are only eligible to return after their team has played eight games instead of after eight weeks. In 2020, the number of players eligible to return to each team in a season increased to three.

Teams may also place a player on injured reserve with a minor injury designation, but the team must release the player once he is healthy.

During the preseason, the league also allows players with long-term, but not season-ending, injuries to be placed into one of three designations: physically unable to perform (PUP), for injuries sustained during the previous season or during offseason training activities (a player who passes their physical at the beginning of training camp and practices is physically able to participate and is thus ineligible for the PUP list), reserve/non-football injury (NFL), for injuries sustained outside of team or league activities (despite the name, this includes lingering injuries from college football play, should an injured player be drafted and join the team), or reserve/non-football illness (NFL), for severe illnesses sustained by players unrelated to football. Players on the PUP list can be moved to the active roster after week 6 of the regular season or placed on injured reserve. , players on the NFL lists can begin practicing after week 6 but cannot be activated until their team has played eight games. When a player from the NFL lists begins practicing, a three-week window starts in which they are eligible to be moved to the active roster. If the player is not activated at the conclusion of the three-week window, they must remain on the NFL list for the rest of the season. During the regular season, players on the PUP list and injured reserve do not count against the league's 53-man roster maximum, but do count against the 90-man roster limit.

NBA rules

Due to abuses in the use of the injured reserve list, where some teams found it convenient to use the IR to stash players without independent medical oversight, the injured reserve has been renamed the Inactive List with the last collective bargaining agreement. The inactive list has a minimum of one player and a maximum of three, subject to hardship rules when a team with three injured players already on its inactive list has a fourth player injured. Players sent to the NBA G League continues to count on a team's inactive list.

WNBA rules
Unlike its parent league, the WNBA has no injury list as of the 2019 season. This notably affected the Seattle Storm going into that season, when reigning league MVP Breanna Stewart tore her right Achilles in the 2019 EuroLeague Women final. Because of the lack of an injured list, the Storm suspended Stewart without pay to free up a roster spot. (The WNBA would later make Stewart a paid league ambassador during her rehabilitation.)

The league had an injury list when it began play in 1997; players placed on this list were required to sit out at least three games. In 2006, the league changed to an inactive list of up to two players, but it was eliminated after the 2008 season, when rosters were reduced to 11. WNBA rosters now consist of 12 players.

MLB rules

There are four types of injured reserve lists in Major League Baseball.

Up to 7 Games:  The Paternity and Bereavement Lists in MLB are designed for family situations.  A player on Bereavement List for the health or funeral of another family member may miss 3-7 games, while Paternity List players for birth of a child allows a player up to three games missed.

7 Days:  When a player is placed in concussion protocol, players will be assigned to the seven-day IL to prevent long-term brain damage.  If a player is not activated by the seventh day, he is moved to the regular IL.

10 Days:  Depending on severity and/or recovery time, a player is placed on the ten-day IL. Players may attend games and stay with the team, and leave the team for minor league rehabilitation assignments if necessary.  The player is removed from the active roster, but not the 40-man roster.

60 Days: More severe injuries will result in a player being placed on the 60-day IL.  The player will not be listed on the 40-man roster, allowing an additional player to be available. A player can not be put on the 60-day IL unless a team's 40-man roster is full.

References

Sports terminology
Sports injuries